Trent Campbell (born December 24, 1982 in Beauval, Saskatchewan, Canada) is a former professional ice hockey winger who currently plays senior men's hockey for the Rosthern Wheat Kings of the Fort Carlton Hockey League.

Playing career
Campbell played junior hockey for the La Ronge Ice Wolves of the SJHL, before attending Lake Superior State University, where he played hockey for 4 seasons between 2003 and 2007.

Campbell joined the South Carolina Stingrays of the ECHL in 2007, and has played at least part of a season with them for every season of his professional career. He has been called up to the AHL several times, spending time with the Portland Pirates, Worcester Sharks, Houston Aeros, and Bridgeport Sound Tigers.

After the 2011–12 season with the Stingrays, Campbell announced his retirement from professional hockey.

Personal life

Arrest
While on a road trip to play the Florida Everblades in 2012, Campbell was arrested for Grand Theft Auto by Collier County Sheriff's officers after he allegedly stole a taxi outside an upscale Naples, Florida bar. He was indefinitely suspended from the team pending the outcome of his case.

Career statistics

References

External links

1982 births
Canadian ice hockey left wingers
Bridgeport Sound Tigers players
Houston Aeros (1994–2013) players
Ice hockey people from Saskatchewan
Lake Superior State University alumni
Living people
Ours de Villard-de-Lans players
Portland Pirates players
South Carolina Stingrays players
Worcester Sharks players
Canadian expatriate ice hockey players in France